Rotaliata is a class of Foraminifera characterized by tests that are exclusively multichambered, mostly planospiral or trochspiral, or derived from either. The aperture is commonly at the base of the apertural face, at least in early stages, but may be terminal, and single or complex. Test interior may be complex with secondary chambers and interconnecting canal system.
 
Composition is of hyaline (glassy) calcite as in the Rotaliana and Globigerinana  or agglutinated as in the Textulariana.

References
 Rotaliata in Systematical Taxonomy of Foraminifera (Mikhalevich 2004), 
 Morphological classification of foraminifera, Valeria I. Mikhalevich et al.. 
Barun K. Sen Gupta 2002.  Modern foraminifera

Further reading

 
Foraminifera classes